Shandar-e Balnageh (also Romanized as Shandar-e Bālangeh; also known as Shandar) is a village in Amlash-e Jonubi Rural District, in the Central District of Amlash County, Gilan Province, Iran. At the 2006 census, its population was 94, in 29 families.

References 

Populated places in Amlash County